Breslau GO Station is a planned GO Transit train station to be built by Metrolinx near the community of Breslau in Woolwich, Ontario, as part of GO Transit's Regional Express Rail (RER) expansion program. The preliminary plan is to provide approximately 1000 parking spaces. A kiss and ride area and a bus loop are also planned to be provided. Metrolinx expects the station's daily ridership to be 2,480 in 2031.

History

Proposed GO Station

The station was initially proposed in 2009 as part of the extension of the line from Georgetown to Kitchener and was meant to handle Waterloo Region's park and ride demand. The station wasn't built as part of that expansion and station was proposed again in 2015, as part of a larger list of potential future stations. On June 27, 2016, Minister of Transportation Steven Del Duca announced the station would be built as part of the RER program and it was confirmed by Metrolinx the next day. In July 2016, the Initial Business Case analysis report was released, rating the station high for affordability and ease of construction but low for ridership. In November 2019, it was announced that the RER project, which includes the station, will be completed by 2025.

GTR/CNR Breslau Railway Station

The planned train station in Breslau is the community's second; the first was a single storey wood structure built by the Grand Trunk Railway in 1856. The GTR station was located on the south side of the tracks, and the west side of Woolwich Street South. Later assumed by Canadian National Railway as a railway/telegraph station, passenger service was abandoned sometime between 1961 and 1967. The station was demolished and is now the site of Fleischauer Brothers Landscaping.

References

Proposed railway stations in Canada

Future GO Transit railway stations
Railway stations in Woolwich, Ontario